Canadian federal elections have provided the following results in Nova Scotia.

Regional Profile
Nova Scotia has historically been a conservative region, with former prime ministers Charles Tupper and Robert Borden (native sons who governed as leaders of the historical Conservative Party), and Brian Mulroney (who governed as leader of the successor Progressive Conservative, or PC, Party) along with PC Opposition leader Robert Stanfield (who was previously the province's premier) holding seats in the province for extended periods of time. However, unlike rural ridings in the prairies, most Nova Scotia voters hold Red Tory views rather than socially conservative ones, as reflected in Nova Scotia being one of the few areas in the country where the PCs remained competitive between their 1993 collapse and their 2003 merger with the Canadian Alliance into the present-day Conservative Party of Canada. The Liberals swept Nova Scotia in their 1993 landslide, but lost all eleven seats in 1997—six to the New Democratic Party (NDP) and five to the PCs. Under former leader Alexa McDonough, the NDP made major gains there in 1997, picking up seats in the Halifax and Cape Breton areas. The Liberals, wiped out in 1997, made a resurged in 2000.

Today, the Liberals are at their strongest in Cape Breton and the Halifax area, the NDP are at their strongest in the Halifax area, and the Conservatives are at their strongest in rural mainland Nova Scotia. In 2015, the Liberals swept Nova Scotia in convincing fashion, winning an outright majority of the votes cast in all but one riding; that year, they won every seat in Atlantic Canada. In 2019, the Liberals maintained their dominance in the province, winning 10 out of 11 ridings, with one riding, West Nova, going Conservative.

2019 - 43rd General Election

2015 - 42nd General Election

2011 - 41st General Election

2008 - 40th General Election

2006 - 39th General Election
All incumbent MPs in Nova Scotia were re-elected. There were six Liberal, three Conservatives and two NDP MPs in the province.

2004 - 38th General Election
With Toronto's Jack Layton replacing Alexa McDonough as leader, the NDP saw its hold on the Halifax Region slip somewhat, losing Dartmouth.  The Liberals, after having gained MP Scott Brison from the Progressive Conservatives in 2003, held Kings-Hants.  A hoped-for breakthrough for the Conservatives remained elusive.

2000 - 37th General Election

Elections in Nova Scotia
Canadian federal election results